Hiroko Tabuchi is an American journalist who has reported from Japan and the United States, and is known for her coverage of the Fukushima Daiichi nuclear disaster in 2011 and its aftermath. She has worked for The New York Times since 2008, and previously written for The Wall Street Journal and the Tokyo bureau of the Associated Press. She was the member of a team of reporters that won a Pulitzer Prize in 2013 and a team that was finalist in 2011.

Early life 
Tabuchi is originally from Kobe, Japan. She received her undergraduate degree from the London School of Economics and Political Science.

Career 

Tabuchi's career has had an international scope and been characterized by the wide variety of topics she has covered. Though currently based in New York, Tabuchi spent a significant portion of her career working in Tokyo, Japan.

She has also contributed to the New York Public Radio on several occasions on topics ranging from nuclear meltdown to significant mechanical failures from major car brands. She has also contributed to The World, The Independent, and several other international publications.

Awards and honors 
According to the New York Times, Tabuchi was "part of the team awarded the Pulitzer Prize for Explanatory Reporting" in 2013, and "part of a team whose coverage of the tsunami and nuclear disaster in Japan was named a finalist for the Pulitzer Prize for international reporting" in 2011.

She was also the winner of the National Press Foundation Innovative Storyteller Award in 2020, in part for having "led the coverage of the 2011 nuclear disaster in Japan" for the New York Times.

References 

Created via preloaddraft
American women journalists of Asian descent
Year of birth missing (living people)
The Wall Street Journal people
The New York Times people
Pulitzer Prize for Explanatory Journalism winners
Living people
Alumni of the London School of Economics
People from Kobe
Japanese emigrants to the United States
21st-century American women